Themeda arguens, commonly known as Christmas grass, is a species of grass. It is found in South Asia, Eastern Asia, Australia, the south-western Pacific and the Caribbean.

References 

Andropogoneae
Grasses of Asia
Grasses of India
Taxa named by Carl Linnaeus